Clethra scabra is a shrub or tree growing in habitats from  in altitude, native to the eastern Andes and adjacent montane woodlands and Chaco of Brazil, Bolivia, Paraguay, and northwest Argentina. It is able to reach  in height, and is known to flower during March. These leaves tend to bear stellate hairs, and have prominent veins upon their abaxial face. The white flowers are small, borne upon a terminal spray of racemes.

References 

Flora of Brazil
Flora of Bolivia
Flora of Paraguay
Flora of Argentina
Taxa named by Christiaan Hendrik Persoon
scabra
Flora of the Atlantic Forest